Margerie Glacier is a  long tidewater glacier in Glacier Bay, Alaska, United States within the boundaries of Glacier Bay National Park and Preserve. The glacier begins on the southern slopes of Mount Root, elevation , on the AlaskaCanada border flowing southeast down the valley, then turning to the northeast toward its terminus in Tarr Inlet. Margerie Glacier is one of the most active and frequently-visited glaciers in Glacier Bay, which was declared a National Monument in 1925, a National Park and Preserve in 1980, a UNESCO World Biosphere Reserve in 1986 and a World Heritage Site in 1992. While most of the tidewater glaciers in the park have been receding over the last several decades, Margerie Glacier has become stable, neither growing nor receding, while Johns Hopkins Glacier is advancing.

In 1750, Glacier Bay was a massive single glacier but due to higher average temperatures and lower average snowfall amounts over the last several centuries it has been transformed into what is now a  fjord with many smaller glaciers. Margerie Glacier is located at the extreme northwestern end of the bay and is situated perpendicular to the Grand Pacific Glacier.

Glacier Bay and its many glaciers are approachable only by air and water as there are no roads in the park. The steep drop off of Margerie Glacier terminus allows cruise ships and smaller park tour boats to anchor nearby providing close-up views of ice calving.

History
Margerie Glacier is named after French geologist and geographer Emmanuel de Margerie who visited the area in 1913. When John Muir first visited the bay in 1879 the ice had retreated  into the bay. The ice wall has since retreated  from the mouth of the bay and is only a remnant of the massive glacier seen by Vancouver. The bay now contains eight tidewater glaciers, including Margerie, within small inlets along its perimeter.

The glaciers in Glacier Bay are remnants of a general ice advancethe Little Ice Agethat began about 4,000 years ago. This advance is not comparable to continental glaciation that occurred during the Wisconsin Ice Age of the Pleistocene epoch. About 1750, the Little Ice Age reached its maximum stage and a general recession of glaciers began. In the 1990s, Margerie Glacier was attached to the Grand Pacific Glacier; however, it has since detached from the Grand Pacific which is receding, with debris from a moraine left behind in the gap between the glaciers.

Features

Margerie Glacier is categorized as a tidewater glacier, one of eleven remaining in the park, with eight in the bay and three on the Pacific Ocean coastal area of the park. A tidewater glacier is one whose terminus encounters seawater at least at high tide, if not at all tide levels. Margerie Glacier and six other glaciers have termini that are fully submerged at all tide levels. Like many glaciers it contains moraines which appear as dark areas composed of dirt, stones and larger rocks mixed in with the ice and transported downstream to eventually be ejected from the glacier's terminus. The glacial ice appears blue as a result of the absorption of red, orange, yellow and green wavelengths of light and, consequently, pools of meltwater on top of the glacier will appear bright blue. Margerie Glacier is a much cleaner glacier with less debris compared to the Grand Pacific Glacier located adjacent to Margerie's northeastern flank. It is also one of the most active glaciers for ice calving along with the Johns Hopkins Glacier. As a glacier calves it makes sounds similar to gunshots from the cracking of the ice and the release of trapped air, then a roaring boom as the ice tumbles down into the sea. Freshwater upwellings emerge from the central area of the glacier's terminus, generated by meltwater streams running underneath the glacier. Such areas attract sea birds which feed on the fish that can be found there.

In a study of the bedrock geology and mineral resources of Glacier Bay, out of 17 areas classified as containing mineral deposits, Margerie Glacier has been identified as containing copper deposits.

Flora and fauna
Margerie Glacier is a part of the Glacier Bay National Park and Preserve whichwith its combination of tidewater glaciers, coastlines, fjords, rivers and lakesprovides widely varying landscapes and seascapes that support 333 vascular plant taxa, 274 bird species, 160 fish species, 41 mammal species, and 3 amphibian species. Arctic terns and gulls nest in the rocks of Margerie Glacier. As this glacier calves, it disturbs the krill and small fish, thus making it an ideal spot for birds. Humpback whales and grizzly bears are also sometimes seen near this glacier. Studies have been performed on Margerie Glacier on glacier mice, which are colonies of mosses which move across the glacier over time, due to forces that are not well understood.

See also
Glacier Bay
Glacier Bay National Park and Preserve
Grand Pacific Glacier
Fairweather Range
Mount Forde

References

External links

Glacier Bay National Park (official NPS site)
Glacier info (NPS)
Fairweather range climbing history (NPS)
Glacier Bay Map (NPS)
Flash Earth satellite map of Margerie Glacier

Glaciers of Alaska
Glaciers of Hoonah–Angoon Census Area, Alaska
Glaciers of Unorganized Borough, Alaska